San Giuseppe is a Baroque church in Parma.

The church was built from 1626-1666 under the designs of Girolamo Rainaldi. Work was interrupted by the plague affecting the city. The façade was completed in 1782 from a design by Antonio Brianti.

The interior has canvases featuring St Cecilia by Paolo Ferrari and John the Baptist and S. Francesco di Sales by Giuseppe Peroni, paintings acquired after the suppression of the parochial church of Santa Cecilia.

References 

Giuseppe
Baroque architecture in Parma
17th-century Roman Catholic church buildings in Italy
Roman Catholic churches completed in 1666
1666 establishments in Italy